The Remixes is an EP by Greek pop singer Anna Vissi, which was released in the summer of 2003 and included remixed songs from her album X.

Track listing
"Se Zilevo (Galleon Electro-Pop Mix)"
"Tyfli Empistosyni (Takis Damaschis Remix)"
"X (Soumka Mix)"
"Hronia Polla (Valentino Remix)"
"Tasis Aftoktonias (The Bombay Remix by Elias Pantazopoulos)"

External links
Anna Vissi Official Website

2003 EPs
Albums produced by Nikos Karvelas
Greek-language albums
2003 remix albums
Remix EPs
Anna Vissi EPs
Anna Vissi remix albums
Sony Music Greece remix albums
Sony Music Greece EPs
Columbia Records remix albums
Columbia Records EPs